Joe Stewardson was a South African film actor.

Career

Partial filmography

 All the Way to Paris (1965)
 Wild Season (1967)
 Katrina (1969)
 My Way (1973)
 Target of an Assassin (1976)
 My Way II (1977)
 Flatfoot in Africa (1978)
 City of Blood (1982)
 Circles in a Forest (1990)
 Act of Piracy (1990)

Death
He died in 1997.{ of a heart attack }

References

Bibliography

 Tomaselli, Keyan (1989). The Cinema of Apartheid: Race and Class in South African Film. Routledge (London, England).  .

External links
 Database (undated). "Stewardson, Joe".  The British Film Institute Film and Television Database.  Accessed 12 August 2010.
 

1997 deaths
South African male film actors
Year of birth missing
Date of death missing